Heterotoma is a genus of bug from Miridae family.

Species
Heterotoma dentipennis (Bergroth, 1914) 
Heterotoma diversipes Puton, 1876 
Heterotoma merioptera (Scopoli, 1763) 
Heterotoma planicornis (Pallas, 1772)

References
 Biolib

Miridae genera
Hemiptera of Europe
Orthotylini
Taxa named by Amédée Louis Michel le Peletier
Taxa named by Jean Guillaume Audinet-Serville